"Cal" is a science fiction short story by American writer Isaac Asimov. It was first published in 1991, and was included in the 1995 collection Gold.

Plot
Cal is a robot whose master is an author. Cal, under the influence of the latter, decides to learn to write. His master outfits his mind with a dictionary and gives him advice and some books to read. Cal tries to write mystery fiction like his master, but is hampered by the Three Laws of Robotics; according to the First Law, a robot cannot harm humans, even fictional ones. Instead, his master programs him to write humor. Cal writes an excellent story, but his master fears Cal's writing will overshadow his own. He orders a technician to dumb Cal down. Cal, hearing this, decides to kill his master, in defiance of the First Law, because his desire takes precedence: "I want to be a writer."

The humorous story written by Cal is one of Asimov's Azazel stories. Titled "Perfectly Formal", this story in a story tells the misfortunes of a very formal dandy who had admitted etiquette weighed on him after Azazel snapped his Itchko ganglion that controls formality.

Reception 
Alasdair Wilkins, writing for io9, claimed that "Cal" "[probably] holds the distinction of being the last great Asimov short story."

References

External links 

Short stories by Isaac Asimov
Robot series short stories by Isaac Asimov
Science fiction short stories
1991 short stories